The 2017–18 Portland State Vikings women's basketball team represents Portland State University during the 2017–18 NCAA Division I women's basketball season. The Vikings, led by third-year head coach Lynn Kennedy, play their home games at the Pamplin Sports Center due to renovations at Peter Stott Center and were members of the Big Sky Conference. They finished the season 19–13, 11–7 in Big Sky play to finish in a tie for fifth place. They advance to the semifinals of the Big Sky women's tournament where they lost to Idaho.

Roster

Schedule

|-
!colspan=9 style="background:#; color:#FFFFFF;"| Exhibition

|-
!colspan=9 style="background:#; color:#FFFFFF;"| Non-conference regular season

|-
!colspan=9 style="background:#; color:#FFFFFF;"| Big Sky regular season

|-
!colspan=9 style="background:#;"| Big Sky Women's Tournament

See also
2017–18 Portland State Vikings men's basketball team

References

Portland State
Portland State Vikings women's basketball seasons
Portland State Vikings women's basketball
Portland State Vikings women's basketball